Andrea Pasqualon (born 2 January 1988 is an Italian cyclist, who currently rides for UCI WorldTeam . In June 2017, he was named in the startlist for the Tour de France.

Major results

2009
 2nd Trofeo Città di Brescia
 6th Coppa San Geo
 6th Giro del Medio Brenta
 10th Trofeo Alcide Degasperi
2010
 1st Trofeo Banca Popolare di Vicenza
 1st Giro del Casentino
 7th Trofeo Città di Brescia
 8th Trofeo Alcide Degasperi
 9th Trofeo Franco Balestra
 9th Giro del Medio Brenta
2012
 4th Trofeo Matteotti
2013
 1st Stage 2 Tour du Limousin
 2nd Coppa Sabatini
2014
 1st Grand Prix Südkärnten
 1st Stage 7 Vuelta a Colombia
 3rd Gran Premio della Costa Etruschi
 3rd Trofeo Laigueglia
 5th Giro dell'Appennino
 5th Gran Premio Bruno Beghelli
 7th Gran Premio Industria e Commercio di Prato
2015
 2nd Overall Boucles de la Mayenne
1st  Points classification
1st Stage 1
 2nd Grand Prix de la ville de Nogent-sur-Oise
 2nd Trofeo Matteotti
 3rd Tour de Berne
 6th Paris–Troyes
 6th Ronde van Noord-Holland
 6th Coppa Ugo Agostoni
 6th Memorial Marco Pantani
 7th Overall Tour du Limousin
 7th Rund um Köln
 10th Overall Oberösterreich Rundfahrt
1st Stage 2
2016
 2nd Grand Prix of Aargau Canton
 2nd Coppa Sabatini
 3rd Race Horizon Park Classic
 10th Race Horizon Park Race for Peace
2017
 1st Coppa Sabatini
 5th Primus Classic
 6th Gran Premio Bruno Beghelli
 7th Binche–Chimay–Binche
 8th Paris–Tours
 10th Paris–Bourges
2018
 1st  Overall Tour de Luxembourg
1st  Points classification
1st Stages 2 & 3
 1st Grand Prix de Plumelec-Morbihan
 4th Grand Prix de Denain
 4th Eschborn–Frankfurt
 5th Binche–Chimay–Binche
 6th Brabantse Pijl
 6th Grand Prix of Aargau Canton
 6th Boucles de l'Aulne
 7th La Drôme Classic
 7th Grand Prix de la Ville de Lillers
 7th Paris–Bourges
2019
 1st Stage 5 Tour Poitou-Charentes en Nouvelle-Aquitaine
 2nd Grand Prix of Aargau Canton
 3rd Overall Tour de Luxembourg
 4th Paris–Bourges
 7th Tacx Pro Classic
 7th Grand Prix de Plumelec-Morbihan
 8th Gran Premio Bruno Beghelli
2020
 2nd Coppa Sabatini
 3rd Trofeo Playa de Palma
 5th Trofeo Campos, Porreres, Felanitx, Ses Salines
 5th Memorial Marco Pantani
 9th Giro della Toscana
2021
 2nd Ronde van Drenthe
 3rd Le Samyn
 3rd Paris–Chauny
 4th Eschborn–Frankfurt
 7th La Roue Tourangelle
 8th Paris–Tours
 8th Grand Prix of Aargau Canton
 8th Giro del Veneto
 10th Binche–Chimay–Binche
2022
 1st Circuit de Wallonie
 7th Egmont Cycling Race
 8th Omloop Het Nieuwsblad
 10th Antwerp Port Epic
 10th Schaal Sels
2023
 8th Omloop Het Nieuwsblad

Grand Tour general classification results timeline

References

External links

1988 births
Living people
Italian male cyclists
People from Bassano del Grappa
Sportspeople from the Province of Vicenza